In probability theory, the dimension doubling theorems are two results about the Hausdorff dimension of an image of a Brownian motion. In their core both statements say, that the dimension of a set  under a Brownian motion doubles almost surely.

The first result is due to Henry P. McKean jr and hence called McKean's theorem (1955). The second theorem is a refinement of McKean's result and called Kaufman's theorem (1969) since it was proven by Robert Kaufman.

Dimension doubling theorems 
For a -dimensional Brownian motion  and a set  we define the image of  under , i.e.

McKean's theorem 
Let  be a Brownian motion in dimension . Let , then

-almost surely.

Kaufman's theorem 
Let   be a Brownian motion in dimension . Then -almost surley, for any set , we have

Difference of the theorems 
Kaufman's result on the other hand is true for all choices of  simultaneously. This means Kaufman's theorem can also be applied to random sets .

Literature

References 

Wiener process
Probability theorems